The Star Shoot Stakes is a Thoroughbred horse race run annually at Woodbine Racetrack in Toronto, Ontario, Canada. Run in mid April, it is the first stakes race of the Woodbine racing season. An ungraded stakes race contested on dirt over six furlongs, it is open to three-year-old fillies.

Inaugurated in 1956 at Greenwood Raceway, and named for Star Shoot, the sire of Sir Barton, the race was hosted by the Fort Erie Racetrack from 1967 through 1975 before moving to its present location at Woodbine Racetrack in 1976. Since inception it has been contested at various distances:
  6 furlongs : 1956, 1967 to present
  6.5 furlongs : 1957
  7 furlongs : 1958–1966

The Star Shoot Stakes was run in two divisions in 1961, 1979, 1986, and in 1999.

Records
Speed  record: 
 1:10.00 Happy Victory (1972)

Most wins by an owner:
 5 – Windfields Farm (1958, 1960, 1961, 1966, 1969)

Most wins by a jockey:
 5 – Sandy Hawley (1971, 1972, 1974, 1989, 1996)

Most wins by a trainer:
 5 – Gordon J. McCann (1958, 1960, 1961, 1966, 1969)

Winners since 1989

Earlier winners 

 1986 – Playlist
 1985 – Burke's Express
 1984 – Ada Prospect
 1983 – Forest Green
 1982 – Top Canary
 1981 – Muskoka Weekend
 1980 – Girls'l Be Girls
 1979 – Reasonable Sin
 1979 – High Voltage Sport
 1978 – La Sorciere
 1977 – Jansum Regal
 1976 – Regal Gal
 1975 – Deepstar
 1974 – Trudie Tudor
 1973 – Impressive Lady
 1972 – Happy Victory
 1971 – Lauries Dancer
 1970 – Lady Cornwall
 1969 – Drama School
 1968 – Vics Turn
 1967 – Northern Blonde
 1966 – Gay North
 1965 – Win Again
 1964 – Later Mel
 1963 – Charlene B.
 1962 – Vase
 1961 – Victoria Regina
 1961 – Chops On
 1960 – Menantic
 1959 – Wonder Where
 1958 – Windy Answer
 1957 – Pink Velvet
 1956 – Orchestra

Notes

References
 The Star Shoot Stakes at Pedigree Query
 The Star Shoot Stakes Division 2  at Pedigree Query

Ungraded stakes races in Canada
Flat horse races for three-year-old fillies
Recurring sporting events established in 1956
Woodbine Racetrack